is a Japanese tokusatsu drama and the 43rd entry of the Toei Company's long-running Super Sentai series, succeeding Kaitou Sentai Lupinranger VS Keisatsu Sentai Patranger and following the four week special TV miniseries Super Sentai Strongest Battle. Although the series primarily aired in the Reiwa era, it is considered the final Heisei era series as it began airing during it. It is the fourth Super Sentai series to utilize the motif of dinosaurs, having been preceded by Zyuden Sentai Kyoryuger (and Zyuden Sentai Kyoryuger Brave), as well as the first to utilize the motif of knights. 

The show aired from March 17, 2019, to March 1, 2020, joining Kamen Rider Zi-O, later Kamen Rider Zero-One, in the Super Hero Time line-up on TV Asahi affiliate stations. Additionally, Ryusoulger began airing in South Korea in August 2019 as Power Rangers Dino Soul and its footage was adapted for Power Rangers Dino Fury.

Story

65 million years ago, the knights of the Ryusoul Tribe were selected to participate in a war campaign against the dictating Druidon Tribe who sought to rule Earth. But the Druidon's war campaign was halted by the meteor that brought the age of the dinosaurs to an end, forcing them to flee into space. Meanwhile, the Kishiryu were placed in a deep sleep as a failsafe should the Druidon return. The chosen knights choose to live in peace while passing their mantle down across generations. In the present day, the Druidon return to reclaim Earth as the current generation of knights, the new Ryusoulgers, battle them with the support of Ui Tatsui and her father Naohisa Tatsui.

Episodes

Production
The trademark for the series was filed by Toei Company on September 20, 2018.

Films

Time Slip! Dinosaur Panic!!
 was released in Japan on July 26, 2019, double-billed with the film for Kamen Rider Zi-O. Actors Shirō Sano and Rie Kitahara portrayed the film's main antagonist, Valma, and Yuno respectively. In the film's storyline, the Ryusoulgers end up in the Mesozoic Era where they learn the truth of their ancestors' warlike nature as they are forced to fight them and Gaisoulg to save the future. The events of the movie take place between episodes 14 and 15. This is the first Reiwa-era Super Sentai movie, released two months after the 2019 Japanese imperial transition.

Ryusoulger VS Lupinranger VS Patranger
The film features a crossover between Ryusoulger and Kaitou Sentai Lupinranger VS Keisatsu Sentai Patranger, and was double billed with the prelude film for Mashin Sentai Kiramager. The events of the movie take place between episodes 40 and 41.

Memory of Soulmates
 was released in Japan on February 20, 2021, as part of  alongside Mashin Sentai Kiramager the Movie: Be-Bop Dream and Kikai Sentai Zenkaiger the Movie: Red Battle! All Sentai Great Assemble!!. The film is set between episodes 32 and 33 of the series, with guest actress Kanon Miyahara portraying a character called Maiko. The film's opening includes a dedication to Ui Tatsui's actress, Mana Kinjo, following her death in December 2020.

V-Cinema

Kiramager vs. Ryusoulger
 is a V-Cinema release that features a crossover between Ryusoulger and Mashin Sentai Kiramager. The V-Cinema received a limited theatrical release on April 29, 2021, followed by its DVD and Blu-ray release on August 4, 2021.

Web series
 is a three-episode web-exclusive series released on Toei Tokusatsu Fan Club on October 17, 2021. The special serves as a prequel to the series with Masaya Kikawada, Jouji Shibue and Miyuu Sawai reprising their roles as Masters Red, Blue, and Pink respectively.

Cast
: 
: 
: 
: 
: 
: 
: 
, : 
: 
: 
: 
Elder: 
: 
: 
:

Voice actors
: 
: 
, Ryusoul Calibur Voice: 
: M·A·O
: 
, Ryusoulger Equipment Voice: 
: 
: 
: 
/: 
: 
Ryusoul Gold Equipment Voice:

Guest cast

: 
: 
: 
Office worker (9): 
Nurse (11): 
: 
: 
: 
: 
: 
Saki's coach (36): 
: 
: 
: 
:

Songs
Opening theme

Ending theme

Notes

References

External links
 at TV Asahi
 at Toei Company
 at Super-Sentai.net
 for Kishiryu Sentai Ryusoulger Special
 for Mashin Sentai Kiramager vs. Ryusoulger

Super Sentai
2019 Japanese television series debuts
2020 Japanese television series endings
Television series about dinosaurs
Fictional knights
Prehistoric people in popular culture